Tillandsia dura is a species of flowering plant in the Bromeliaceae family. Tillandsia dura grows into a group of plants with a whorled leaf form. This species is endemic to Brazil.

References

dura
Flora of Brazil
Taxa named by John Gilbert Baker